A-C Central Community Unit School District 262 brings together students from Ashland and Chandlerville, Illinois. A small, rural district, A-C Central has an elementary school (K-4) in Chandlerville, a junior high school (5–8) in Ashland, and a high school (9–12) at the same facility as the junior high school in Ashland.

, there were approximately 435 students: 196 at A-C Central Elementary, 93 at A-C Central Junior High School, and 139 at A-C Central High School. Also in 2012, the district had 40 certified teachers, 6 bus routes, and 1 special education bus route.

History
Ashland – Chandlerville Community Unit School District No. 262 was formed by the consolidation of Chandlerville Community Unit School District 62 and Ashland Community Unit School District 212 in 1989.    On 25 March 1997, the school board changed the district name to A-C Central Community Unit School District No. 262, renamed the Chandlerville school to A-C Central Junior High, and renamed the Ashland school to A-C Central Elementary School.

As of 2005, the school district has approximately 203 elementary students, 143 junior high students and 150 high school students.

 Consolidation is back on the BoE agenda for their regular board meeting 16 December 2009 though.

A-C Central consolidation with PORTA Community Unit School District 202 failed in the 18 March 2014 election.  The referendum passed by 1,755 to 548 in the PORTA district, but was voted down in the A-C district, by 424 to 515 in Cass County and 46 to 88 in Morgan County.

Footnotes

External links
 A-C Central District #262

Education in Cass County, Illinois
School districts in Illinois
School districts established in 1989
1989 establishments in Illinois